Jakobstad City Hall is a historic building in the city of Jakobstad, Finland. It was completed in 1875. The current look of the building dates from 1890.

City and town halls in Finland
Jakobstad
Buildings and structures in Ostrobothnia (region)
Government buildings completed in 1875